The 1963 Air Force Falcons football team represented the United States Air Force Academy as an independent during the 1963 NCAA University Division football season. Led by sixth-year head coach Ben Martin, the Falcons compiled a record of 7–4. Air Force played in its second bowl game, the Gator Bowl, where they were shut out, 35–0, by North Carolina. The Falcons played their home games at Falcon Stadium in Colorado Springs, Colorado.

Schedule

Personnel

Awards and honors
Joe Rodwell
 All-American (Helms)

References

Air Force
Air Force Falcons football seasons
Air Force Falcons football